Bartels's rat (Sundamys maxi) is a species of rodent in the family Muridae.
It is found only in West Java, Indonesia, including in Gunung Gede Pangrango National Park.

References

Sundamys
Mammals described in 1932
Taxonomy articles created by Polbot